Happiness a la Mode is a 1919 American silent romantic comedy film directed by Walter Edwards and starring Harrison Ford and Constance Talmadge.

Plot
As described in a film magazine review, young husband Richard Townsend finds that he is tired of his wife Barbara and has become infatuated with another woman. Barbara consents to give him a divorce and then determines to win him back within the three months that must elapse prior to the final decree of divorse. By clever ruses she manages to accomplish her purpose and the conclusion finds the pair happily married.

Cast

References

Bibliography
 Jeanine Basinger. Silent Stars. Wesleyan University Press, 2000.

External links

1919 films
1919 comedy films
Silent American comedy films
Films directed by Walter Edwards
American silent feature films
1910s English-language films
Selznick Pictures films
American black-and-white films
1910s American films